Margaret Browne  may refer to:

Margaret Fitzhugh Browne (1884–1972), American painter of portraits
Margaret Stuart (poet), née Browne (1889–1963), British poet and writer
Margaret Browne (swimmer) in Swimming at the 1979 Summer Universiade

See also
Margaret Brown (disambiguation)
Browne (surname)